Padet Vejsawarn (born 26 June 1946) is a Thai sports shooter. He competed in the men's 50 metre rifle three positions event at the 1976 Summer Olympics.

References

1946 births
Living people
Padet Vejsawarn
Padet Vejsawarn
Shooters at the 1976 Summer Olympics
Place of birth missing (living people)
Asian Games medalists in shooting
Shooters at the 1974 Asian Games
Padet Vejsawarn
Medalists at the 1974 Asian Games
Padet Vejsawarn